Saskia Schaft (born 1965), is a Dutch international lawn bowler.

Bowls career

World Championships
She competed for the Netherlands at the 2012 World Outdoor Bowls Championship in Australia and 2016 World Outdoor Bowls Championship in New Zealand. In 2020 she was selected for the 2020 World Outdoor Bowls Championship in Australia.

World Singles Champion of Champions
Schaft was runner-up to Lorna Smith in the 2016 World Singles Champion of Champions.

Atlantic Championships
In 2009 she won the singles bronze medal at the Atlantic Bowls Championships and in 2015 she won the singles silver medal at the Atlantic Bowls Championships.

Dutch National Championships
Indoor: 2011, 2012, 2014, 2015, 2016, 2018, 2019, 2021
Outdoor: 2007, 2008, 2009, 2010, 2012, 2015, 2018

References 

Living people
1965 births
Dutch sportswomen
Female bowls players